Daryl Griffin (born 23 January 1976) is a former Australian rules footballer who played with Footscray in the Australian Football League (AFL).

Griffin was initially drafted by the Sydney Swans. They selected him with pick 28 in the 1993 National Draft, from the Western Jets. A half back, Griffin crossed to Footscray at the end of 1994. He played 14 games in the 1995 AFL season, including Footscray's qualifying final loss to Geelong.

References

External links
 
 

1976 births
Australian rules footballers from Victoria (Australia)
Western Bulldogs players
Western Jets players
Living people